The Kamloops Museum and Archives is a museum and archives located in the city of Kamloops, British Columbia, Canada.  Located at 207 Seymour Street in downtown Kamloops, at the corner of 2nd Avenue. In addition to historical exhibits and educational programmes, the facility also is home to the city's archives, including a special collection, the Mary Balf Archives, focused around the works of Mary Balf, a prolific local historian, but including a wide array of documents from the early fur trade journals onwards.

See also
Mark Sweeten Wade
Nicola Valley Museum and Archives
Secwepemc Museum and Heritage Park
Fort Kamloops

References
Kamloops Museum and Archives homepage
Archives homepage

Museums in British Columbia
Buildings and structures in Kamloops
History museums in British Columbia
Archives in Canada